"You Made a Rock of a Rolling Stone" is a song written by Kix Brooks and Chris Waters, and recorded by American country music group The Oak Ridge Boys.  It was released in July 1986 as the second single from the album Seasons.  The song reached No. 24 on the Billboard Hot Country Singles & Tracks chart.

Chart performance

References

1986 singles
1986 songs
The Oak Ridge Boys songs
Songs written by Kix Brooks
Songs written by Chris Waters
Song recordings produced by Ron Chancey
MCA Records singles